Rochester Institute of Technology (RIT) is a private research university in the town of Henrietta in the Rochester, New York, metropolitan area. The university was founded in 1829 and is the tenth largest private university in the United States in terms of full-time students. It is internationally known for its science, computer, engineering, and art programs, as well as for the National Technical Institute for the Deaf, a leading deaf-education institution that provides educational opportunities to more than 1000 deaf and hard-of-hearing students.

RIT is known for its co-op program, which blends professional and industrial experience with traditional classroom based instruction. It has the fourth oldest and one of the largest co-op programs in the world. It is classified among "R2: Doctoral Universities – High research activity".

RIT's student population is approximately 19,000 students, about 16,000 undergraduate and 3000 graduate. Demographically, students attend from all 50 states in the United States and from more than 100 countries around the world. The university has more than 4000 active faculty and staff members who engage with the students in a wide range of academic activities and research projects. It also has branches abroad, its global campuses, located in China, Croatia, Kosovo, and United Arab Emirates (Dubai).

Eleven RIT alumni and faculty members have been recipients of the Pulitzer Prize, winning a total of 15 prizes.

History
The university began as a result of an 1891 merger between Rochester Athenæum, a struggling literary society founded in 1829 by Colonel Nathaniel Rochester and associates, and The Mechanics Institute, a Rochester school of practical technical training for local residents founded in 1885 by a consortium of local businessmen including Captain Henry Lomb, co-founder of Bausch & Lomb. The name of the merged institution at the time was called Rochester Athenæum and Mechanics Institute (RAMI). The Mechanics Institute was considered as the surviving school and took over The Rochester Athenaeum's 1829 founding charter. From the time of the merger until 1944, many of its students, administration and faculty staff alike, not only celebrated the former Mechanics Institute's 1885 founding charter, but its former name as well. In 1944, the school changed its name to Rochester Institute of Technology, re-established The Athenaeum's 1829 founding charter and became a full-fledged research university.

The university originally resided within the city of Rochester, New York, proper, on a block bounded by the Erie Canal, South Plymouth Avenue, Spring Street, and South Washington Street (approximately ). Its art department was originally located in the Bevier Memorial Building. By the middle of the twentieth century, RIT began to outgrow its facilities, and surrounding land was scarce and expensive; additionally, in 1959, the New York Department of Public Works announced a new freeway, the Inner Loop, was to be built through the city along a path that bisected the university's campus and required demolition of key university buildings. In 1961, an unanticipated donation of $3.27 million ($ today) from local Grace Watson, for whom RIT's dining hall was later named, allowed the university to purchase land for a new  campus several miles south along the east bank of the Genesee River in suburban Henrietta. Upon completion in 1968, the university moved to the new suburban campus, where it resides today.

In 1966, RIT was selected by the Federal government to be the site of the newly founded National Technical Institute for the Deaf (NTID). NTID admitted its first students in 1968, concurrent with RIT's transition to the Henrietta campus.

In 1979, RIT took over Eisenhower College, a liberal arts college located in Seneca Falls, New York. Despite making a 5-year commitment to keep Eisenhower open, RIT announced in July 1982 that the college would close immediately. One final year of operation by Eisenhower's academic program took place in the 1982–83 school year on the Henrietta campus. The final Eisenhower graduation took place in May 1983 back in Seneca Falls.

In 1990, RIT started its first PhD program, in imaging science – the first PhD program of its kind in the U.S. RIT subsequently established PhD programs in six other fields: Astrophysical Sciences and Technology, Computing and Information Sciences, Color Science, Microsystems Engineering, Sustainability, and Engineering.
In 1996, RIT became the first college in the U.S to offer a Software Engineering degree at the undergraduate level.

Campus

The main campus is housed on a  property. This property is largely covered with woodland and fresh-water swamp making it a very diverse wetland that is home to a number of somewhat rare plant species. The campus comprises 237 buildings and 5.1 million square feet (474,000 m2) of building space. The nearly universal use of bricks in the campus's construction – estimated at 15,710,693 bricks as of August 6, 2018 – prompted students to give it the semi-affectionate nickname "Brick City," reflected in the name of events such as the annual "Brick City Homecoming." Though the buildings erected in the first few decades of the campus's existence reflected the architectural style known as brutalism, the warm color of the bricks softened the impact somewhat. More recent additions to the campus have diversified the architecture while still incorporating the traditional brick colors. The main campus was listed as a census-designated place in 2020.

In 2009, the campus was named a "Campus Sustainability Leader" by the Sustainable Endowments Institute.

The residence halls and the academic side of campus are connected with a walkway called the "Quarter Mile." Along the Quarter Mile, between the academic and residence hall side are various administration and support buildings. On the academic side of the walkway is a courtyard, known as the Infinity Quad due to a striking polished stainless steel sculpture (by Jose' de Rivera, 1968, 19'×8'×2') of a continuous ribbon-like Möbius strip (commonly referred to as the infinity loop because if the sun hits the strip at a certain angle it will cast a shadow in the shape of an infinity symbol on the ground) in the middle of it; on the residence hall side is a sundial and a clock. These symbols represent time to infinity. The name predates a Sigma Pi Fraternity fundraiser called Quarter the Quarter-Mile, where donated quarters were lined up from the sundial to the Infinity Sculpture. Standing near the Administration Building and the Student Alumni Union is The Sentinel, a steel structure created by the acclaimed metal sculptor, Albert Paley. Reaching 70 feet (21 m) high and weighing 110 tons, the sculpture is the largest on any American university campus. There are four RIT-owned apartment complexes: Global Village, Perkins Green, Riverknoll and University Commons.

Opened in 2004 and named in honor of Lucius "Bob" Gordon and his wife Marie, the Field House hosts numerous campus and community activities, including concerts, career fairs, athletic competitions, graduations, and other functions. Other facilities between the residence halls and academic buildings include the Hale-Andrews Student Life Center, Student Alumni Union, Ingle Auditorium, Clark Gymnasium, Frank Ritter Memorial Ice Arena, and the Schmitt Interfaith Center.

The Red Barn at the west end of the campus is the site of RIT's Interactive Adventures program.

Park Point at RIT (originally referred to as "College Town") is an  multi-use residential and commercial enterprise on the northeast corner of the campus. Park Point is accessible to the rest of the RIT campus through a regular bus service loop, numerous pedestrian paths connecting Park Point to the RIT Main Loop, and main roads. Although originally intended as added student housing, financial penalties resulting from developing on swampland led RIT to lease Park Point to Wilmorite for a period of twenty years and subsequently develop the property without the university incurring additional fees.

Art on campus 
The RIT Art Collection, part of the RIT Archive Collections at RIT Libraries, comprises thousands of works, including hundreds by RIT faculty, students, and alumni. The collection grows every year through the Purchase Prize Program, which enables the university to purchase select art works from students in the School of Art and Design, the School for American Crafts, and the School of Photographic Arts and Sciences.

Many pieces from the collection are on public display around campus, including:
 Sentinel – a 73-foot-tall sculpture created by the acclaimed metal sculptor, Albert Paley, located on Administration Circle.
 Growth and Youth – a set of two murals by Josef Albers located in the lobby of the George Eastman Building.
 Principia – a mural by Larry Kirkland that is etched into the black granite floor of the atrium in the College of Science (Gosnell Hall). The work features illustrations, symbols, formulae, quotes, and images representing milestones in the history of science.
 Three Piece Reclining Figure No. 1 – a bronze sculpture by English artist Henry Moore located in Eastman Kodak Quad.
 Grand Hieroglyph – a 24-foot-long tapestry by Shiela Hicks located in the George Eastman Building.
 Sundial – a sculpture by Alistair Bevington located on the Residence Quad.
 The Monument to Ephemeral Facts – a mixed media sculpture by Douglas Holleley located in Wallace Library.
 Unity – a 24-foot-tall stainless steel sculpture sited between the College of Art and Design, the College of Engineering Technology, and the College of Engineering.

Organization and administration

As of 2017, the president is David C. Munson Jr., formerly the dean of engineering at the University of Michigan. Munson, the university's tenth president, took office on July 1, 2017, replacing William W. Destler, who retired after 10 years at RIT. Ellen Granberg, formerly senior associate provost at Clemson University, was named provost in July 2018. She is the first woman to serve in that role at RIT.

The school is also a member of the Association of Independent Technological Universities.

Colleges

RIT has nine colleges:
 College of Art and Design
 Saunders College of Business
 Golisano College of Computing and Information Sciences
 Kate Gleason College of Engineering
 College of Engineering Technology
 College of Health Sciences and Technology
 College of Liberal Arts
 National Technical Institute for the Deaf
 College of Science

There are also two smaller academic units that grant RIT degrees but do not have full college faculties:
 Golisano Institute for Sustainability
 School of Individualized Study

In addition to these colleges, RIT operates three branch campuses in Europe, one in the Middle East and one in East Asia:
 RIT Croatia (formerly the American College of Management and Technology) in Dubrovnik and Zagreb, Croatia
 RIT Kosovo (formerly the American University in Kosovo) in Pristina, Kosovo
 RIT Dubai in Dubai, United Arab Emirates
 RIT China-Weihai Campus

RIT also has international partnerships with the following schools:
 Yeditepe University in Istanbul, Turkey
 Birla Institute of Technology and Science in India
 Pontificia Universidad Catolica Madre y Maestra (PUCMM) in Dominican Republic
 Instituto Tecnológico de Santo Domingo (INTEC) in Dominican Republic
 Universidad Tecnologica Centro-Americana (UNITEC) in Honduras
 Universidad del Norte (UNINORTE) in Colombia
 Universidad Peruana de Ciencias Aplicadas (UPC) in Peru

Academics

RIT is known for its career focused education. The university is chartered by the New York state legislature and accredited by the Middle States Association of Colleges and Schools. The university offers more than 200 academic programs, including seven doctoral programs across its nine constituent colleges. In 2008–2009, RIT awarded 2,483 bachelor's degrees, 912 master's degrees, 10 doctorates, and 523 other certificates and diplomas.

The four-year, full-time undergraduate program constitutes the majority of enrollments at the university and emphasizes instruction in the "arts & sciences/professions." RIT is a member of the Rochester Area College consortium, which allows students to register at other colleges in the Rochester metropolitan area without tuition charges. RIT's full-time undergraduate and graduate programs used to operate on an approximately 10-week quarter system with the primary three academic quarters beginning on Labor Day in early September and ending in late May. In August 2013, RIT transitioned from a quarter system to a semester system. The change was hotly debated on campus, with a majority of students opposed according to an informal survey; Student Government also voted against the change.

Undergraduate tuition and fees for 2012–2013 totaled $45,602. RIT undergraduates receive over $200 million in financial assistance, and over 90% of students receive some form of financial aid. 3,210 students qualified for Pell Grants in 2007–2008.

Among the eight colleges, 6.8% of the student body is enrolled in the E. Philip Saunders College of Business, 15.0% in the Kate Gleason College of Engineering, 4.3% in the College of Liberal Arts, 25.4% in the College of Applied Science and Technology, 18.0% in the B. Thomas Golisano College of Computing and Information Sciences, 13.9% in the College of Imaging Arts and Science, 5.7% in the National Technical Institute for the Deaf, and 9.2% in the College of Science. The five most commonly awarded degrees are in Business Administration, Engineering Technology, School of Photographic Arts & Sciences, School of Art and Design, and Information Technology.

RIT has struggled with student retention, although the situation has improved during president Destler's tenure. 91.3% of freshmen in the fall of 2009 registered for fall 2010 classes, which Destler noted as a school record.

Student body

RIT enrolled 13,711 undergraduate (9,190 male, 4,466 female, and 55 unknown) and 3,131 graduate students in fall 2015. There were 11,226 males and 5,537 females, resulting in a ratio of just over 2 (2.03) males per 1 female. Admissions are characterized as "more selective, higher transfer-in" by the Carnegie Foundation. RIT received 12,725 applications for undergraduate admission in Fall 2008, 60% were admitted, 34% enrolled, and 84% of students re-matriculated as second-year students. The interquartile range on the SAT was 1630–1910. 26% of students graduated after four years and 64% after six years. As of 2013, the 25th–75th percentile SAT scores are 540–650 Critical Reading, 570–680 Math, and 520–630 Writing—the average composite score being 1630–1960.

Notable academic programs

The Imaging science department was the first at the university to offer a doctoral program, in 1989, and remains the only formal program in Imaging Science in the nation (as a multidisciplinary field—separate constituent fields of physics, optics, and computer science are common in higher education). Associations exist between the department and Rochester-area imagery and optics companies such as Xerox, Kodak, and the ITT Corporation. Such connections have reinforced the research portfolio, expertise, and graduate reputation of the imaging researchers and staff of the department. As of 2008, imaging-related research has the largest budget at the university from grants and independent research.

The microelectronic engineering program, created in 1982 and the only ABET-accredited undergraduate program in the country, was the nation's first Bachelor of Science program specializing in the fabrication of semiconductor devices and integrated circuits. The information technology program was the first nationally recognized IT degree, created in 1993.

In 1996, Rochester Institute of Technology established the first software engineering bachelor's degree program in the United States but did not obtain ABET accreditation until 2003, the same time as Clarkson University, Milwaukee School of Engineering and Mississippi State University.

Starting in 2000, RIT began admitting students in the top of their application pools into the RIT Honors Program. Each college participates voluntarily in the program and defines their own program details. As an example, the College of Engineering focuses on engineering in a global economy, and uses much of the honors budget to pay for domestic and international trips for engineering students. In contrast, the College of Science is focused on expanding research, and provides most of its budget to student research endeavors. Students admitted to the program are given a small scholarship and have the opportunity to live in the honors residence hall.

In 2019, the video game design program at RIT, one of two majors offered by School of Interactive Games and Media in the B. Thomas Golisano College of Computing and Information Sciences (GCCIS), was recognized by The Princeton Review as one of the top 10 programs in the country for video game design, with the undergraduate program ranking eighth, and the master's degree graduate program ranking seventh.

RIT is the first, and only school in the United States to offer an undergraduate minor in Free and Open Source Software and Free Culture.

Rankings

In 2017, RIT was ranked No. 97 (tie) in the National Universities category by U.S. News & World Report.
Business Insider ranked RIT No. 14 in Northeast and No. 36 in the country for Computer Science.
RIT was ranked among the top 50 national universities in a national survey of "High School Counselors Top College Picks".
RIT's Saunders College of Business ranked No. 26 in the United States for "Best Online MBA Programs" for the online executive MBA program by U.S. News & World Report. Times Higher Education/The Wall Street Journal ranked the MBA program at Saunders College of Business No. 54 among business colleges and universities around the world for the year 2019.
RIT was ranked among the top 20 universities recognized for excellent co-operative learning and internship programs. It was further placed at No. 24 in the top 30 universities for Computer Science with the best Returns on Investment (ROI) in the US.

College Factual, the ranking data provider for USA Today College Guide 2019, ranked RIT in various academic areas as follows:
 No.1 in Computer Software and Application 
 No. 3 in Computer and Information Sciences
 No. 3 in computer science in the state of New York
 No. 29 in computer science overall
 No. 14 in computer engineering
 No. 62 in electrical engineering
 No. 34 in industrial engineering
 No. 6 in management information systems
 No. 31 in applied mathematics
 No. 13 in design and applied arts
 No. 16 in film, video and photographic arts
 No. 76 in visual and performing arts
 No. 16 in film, video and photographic arts
 No. 31 in hospitality management
 No. 43 in criminal justice
 No. 53 for "best school for veterans"
 No. 79 in engineering

The Princeton Review ranked RIT No. 8 nationally for "top schools for video game design for 2019" in undergraduate programs and No. 7 in graduate programs. Among the top 75 universities for Video Game Design in the US, RIT was ranked No. 4.

Co-op program
RIT's co-op program, which began in 1912, is the fourth-oldest in the world. It is also the fifth-largest in the nation, with approximately 3,500 students completing a co-op each year at over 2,000 businesses. The program requires (or allows, depending on major) students to work in the workplace for up to five quarters alternating with quarters of class. The amount of co-op varies by major, usually between 3 and 5 three-month "blocks" or academic quarters. Many employers prefer students to co-op for two consecutive blocks, referred to as a "double-block co-op". During a co-op, the student is not required to pay tuition to the school and is still considered a "full time" student. In addition, RIT was listed by U.S. News & World Report as one of only 12 colleges nationally recognized for excellence in the internships/co-ops category and has secured this ranking, which is based on nominations from college presidents, chief academic officers and deans, for four years in a row since U.S. News began the category in 2002. Additionally, according to the most recent PayScale College Salary Report, the median starting salary for a recent RIT graduate is $51,000 making it among the highest of all Rochester area institutions.

Library and special collections 

RIT Libraries house renowned special collections that enhance teaching, learning, and research in many of RIT's academic programs. The Cary Graphic Arts Collection contains books, manuscripts, printing type specimens, letterpress printing equipment, documents, and other artifacts related to the history of graphic communication. RIT Archives document more than 180 years of the university's history, and students in the Museum Studies program frequently work with these artifacts and help create exhibitions. The RIT/NTID Deaf Studies Archive preserves and illustrates the history, art, culture, technology, and language of the Deaf community. The RIT Art Collection contains thousands of works showcasing RIT's visual arts curriculum.

Vignelli Center for Design Studies

The Vignelli Center for Design Studies was established in 2010 and houses the archives of Italian designers Massimo and Lella Vignelli. The center is a hub for design education, scholarship and research.

Research

RIT's research programs are rapidly expanding. The total value of research grants to university faculty for fiscal year 2007–2008 totaled $48.5 million, an increase of more than twenty-two percent over the grants from the previous year. The university currently offers eight PhD programs: Imaging science, Microsystems Engineering, Computing and Information Sciences, Color science, Astrophysical Sciences and Technology, Sustainability, Engineering, and Mathematical modeling.

In 1986, RIT founded the Chester F. Carlson Center for Imaging Science, and started its first doctoral program in Imaging Science in 1989. The Imaging Science department also offers the only Bachelors (BS) and Masters (MS) degree programs in imaging science in the country. The Carlson Center features a diverse research portfolio; its major research areas include Digital Image Restoration, Remote Sensing, Magnetic Resonance Imaging, Printing Systems Research, Color Science, Nanoimaging, Imaging Detectors, Astronomical Imaging, Visual Perception, and Ultrasonic Imaging.

The Center for Microelectronic and Computer Engineering was founded by RIT in 1986. The university was the first university to offer a bachelor's degree in Microelectronic Engineering. The center's facilities include 50,000 square feet (4,600 m2) of building space with 10,000 square feet (930 m2) of clean room space; the building will undergo an expansion later this year. Its research programs include nano-imaging, nano-lithography, nano-power, micro-optical devices, photonics subsystems integration, high-fidelity modeling and heterogeneous simulation, microelectronic manufacturing, microsystems integration, and micro-optical networks for computational applications.

The Center for Advancing the Study of CyberInfrastructure (CASCI) is a multidisciplinary center housed in the College of Computing and Information Sciences. The Departments of Computer science, Software Engineering, Information technology, Computer engineering, Imaging Science, and Bioinformatics collaborate in a variety of research programs at this center. RIT was the first university to launch a Bachelor's program in Information technology in 1991, the first university to launch a Bachelor's program in Software Engineering in 1996, and was also among the first universities to launch a Computer science Bachelor's program in 1972. RIT helped standardize the Forth programming language, and developed the CLAWS software package.

The Center for Computational Relativity and Gravitation was founded in 2007. The CCRG comprises faculty and postdoctoral research associates working in the areas of general relativity, gravitational waves, and galactic dynamics. Computing facilities in the CCRG include gravitySimulator, a novel 32-node supercomputer that uses special-purpose hardware to achieve speeds of 4TFlops in gravitational N-body calculations, and newHorizons, a state-of-the art 85-node Linux cluster for numerical relativity simulations.

The Center for Detectors was founded in 2010. The CfD designs, develops, and implements new advanced sensor technologies through collaboration with academic researchers, industry engineers, government scientists, and university/college students. The CfD operates four laboratories and has approximately a dozen funded projects to advance detectors in a broad array of applications, e.g. astrophysics, biomedical imaging, Earth system science, and inter-planetary travel. Center members span eight departments and four colleges.

RIT has collaborated with many industry players in the field of research as well, including IBM, Xerox, Rochester's Democrat and Chronicle, Siemens, NASA, and the Defense Advanced Research Projects Agency (DARPA). In 2005, it was announced by Russell W. Bessette, Executive Director New York State Office of Science Technology & Academic Research (NYSTAR), that RIT will lead the University at Buffalo and Alfred University in an initiative to create key technologies in microsystems, photonics, nanomaterials, and remote sensing systems and to integrate next generation IT systems. In addition, the collaboratory is tasked with helping to facilitate economic development and tech transfer in New York State. More than 35 other notable organizations have joined the collaboratory, including Boeing, Eastman Kodak, IBM, Intel, SEMATECH, ITT, Motorola, Xerox, and several Federal agencies, including as NASA.

RIT has emerged as a national leader in manufacturing research. In 2017, the U.S. Department of Energy selected RIT to lead its Reducing Embodied-Energy and Decreasing Emissions (REMADE) Institute aimed at forging new clean energy measures through the Manufacturing USA initiative. RIT also participates in five other Manufacturing USA research institutes.

In February 2022, James Hammer donated $1 million to establish the packaging and graphics media center at the university. Hammer is the retired CEO of Hammer Packaging and the gift will be used to integrate the print and packaging technologies researching new processes, materials, and sustainability initiatives.

Athletics

RIT has 24 men's and women's varsity teams including Men's Intercollegiate Baseball, Basketball, Cross Country, Ice Hockey, Lacrosse, Rowing, Soccer, Swimming & Diving, Tennis, Track & Field and Wrestling along with Women's Intercollegiate Basketball, Cheerleading, Cross Country, Ice Hockey, Lacrosse, Rowing, Soccer, Softball, Swimming & Diving, Tennis, Track & Field, and Volleyball.

RIT was a long-time member of the Empire 8, an NCAA Division III athletic conference, but moved to the Liberty League beginning with the 2011–2012 academic year. All of RIT's teams compete at the Division III level, with the exception of the men's and women's ice hockey programs, which play at the Division I level. In 2010, the men's ice hockey team was the first ever from the Atlantic Hockey conference to reach the NCAA tournament semi-finals: The Frozen Four.

Sample preparation and polishing for research needs is a practiced sport at RIT. Placed in division 3 in the PIS division, they are strongly overqualified for their role on the athletic field in this sport, placing 1st in 9 of the last 8 championships. Working off a full scholarship and drafted first overall into the major league is John Smith. He now practices his skills full time with the Charlotte Hornets (no not that one).

In 2011–2012, the RIT women's ice hockey team had a regular season record of 28–1–1, and won the NCAA Division III national championship, defeating the defending champion Norwich University 4–1. The women's team had carried a record of 54–3–3 over their past two regular seasons leading up to that point. The women's hockey team then moved from Division III to Division I. Starting in the 2012–2013 season, the women's team played in the College Hockey America conference. In 2014–2015, the team became eligible for NCAA Division I postseason play.

Additionally, RIT has a wide variety of club, intramural, and pick-up sports and teams to provide a less-competitive recreational option to students.

RIT's Alpine Ski Club competes at United States Collegiate Ski & Snowboard Association (USCSA), which uses NCAA II competition and academic standards. The varsity Alpine Ski Team competes at the USCSA Mid East Region.

Tom Coughlin, coach of the NFL's 2008 and 2012 Super Bowl champion New York Giants, taught physical education and was the head coach of the RIT Men's Varsity Football team for four seasons in the early 1970s. Overseeing RIT football's transition from a club sport to an NCAA Division III team, this was the first head coaching job of Coughlin's career with him calling his time at RIT "a great experience."

Since 1968 RIT's hockey teams played at Frank Ritter Memorial Ice Arena on campus. In 2010, RIT began raising money for a new arena. In 2011, B. Thomas Golisano and the Polisseni Foundation donated $4.5 million for the new arena, which came to be named the Gene Polisseni Center. The new 4,300-seat arena was completed in 2014 and the Men's and Women's teams moved into the new facility in September for the 2014–2015 season.

In 2021 and 2022 the RIT Men’s Lacrosse team won back to back D III Championships losing only one game in two years.

Mascot

RIT's athletics nickname is the "Tigers", a name given following the undefeated men's basketball season of 1955–56. Prior to that, RIT's athletic teams were called the "Techmen" and had blue and silver as the sports colors. In 1963, RIT students fundraised using ‘Tigershares’ to buy a rescued Bengal tiger cub that became the university's mascot, named SpiRIT which stands for Student Pride in RIT(Rochester Institute of Technology). Ambitious students were trained as the Tiger Cubs handlers and took him to most sport events until 1964. It was then discovered that the cub was ill and eventually he was put down due to these health complications. The original tiger's pelt now resides in the RIT Archive Collections at RIT Libraries. RIT helped the Seneca Park Zoo purchase a new tiger shortly after SpiRIT's death, but it was not used as a school mascot. A bronze sculpture by D.H.S. Wehle in the center of the Henrietta campus now provides an everlasting version of the mascot.

RIT's team mascot is a version of this Bengal Tiger named RITchie. RITchie was the selected name entered in 1989 by alumnus Richard P. Mislan during a College Activities Board "Name the RIT Tiger" contest. After it was announced that the RIT Men's Hockey Team was moving from Division III to Division I in 2005, RITchie was redesigned and made his debut in the fall of 2006.

Student life

In addition to its academic and athletic endeavors, RIT has over 150 student clubs, 10 major student organizations, a diverse interfaith center and 30 different Greek organizations.

Reporter magazine, founded in 1951, is the university's primary student-run magazine. RIT also has its own ambulance corps, bi-weekly television athletics program RIT SportsZone, pep band, radio station, and tech crew.

The university's Gordon Field House and Activities Center is home to competitive and recreational athletics and aquatics, a fitness center, and an auditorium hosting frequent concerts and other entertainment. Its opening in late 2004 was inaugurated by concerts by performers including Kanye West and Bob Dylan. It is the second-largest venue in Monroe County.

Deaf and hard-of-hearing students
One of RIT's unique features is the large presence of deaf and hard-of-hearing students, who make up 8.8% of the student body. The National Technical Institute for the Deaf, one of RIT's nine colleges, provides interpreting and captioning services to students for classes and events. Many courses' lectures at RIT are interpreted into American Sign Language or captioned in real time for the benefit of hard-of-hearing and deaf students. There are several deaf and hard-of-hearing professors and lecturers, too; an interpreter can vocalize their lectures for hearing students. This significant portion of the RIT population provides another dynamic to the school's diversity, and it has contributed to Rochester's high number of deaf residents per-capita. In 2006, Lizzie Sorkin made RIT history when she became the first deaf RIT Student Government president. In 2010, Greg Pollock became the second deaf RIT Student Government president. In 2018, Robert "Bobby" Moakley became the third deaf RIT Student Government president.

Explore Your Future
Explore Your Future (EYF) is a six-day career exploration program at Rochester Institute of Technology for college-bound deaf and hard-of-hearing high school students who will begin their junior or senior year.

Fraternities and sororities
RIT's campus is host to thirty fraternities and sororities (eighteen fraternities and twelve sororities), that make up 6.5% of the total RIT population. RIT and Phi Kappa Psi alumni built six large buildings for Greek students on the academic side of campus next to the Riverknoll apartments. In addition to these six houses, there is also limited space within the residence halls for another six chapters.

Interfraternity Council
The Interfraternity Council (IFC) provides outlets for social interaction among the fraternity and sorority members. The IFC helps to sponsor educational opportunities for all of its members and to help to promote the fraternal ideals of leadership, scholarship, service, community and brotherhood. There are currently eleven chapters that are part of the IFC at RIT.

Panhellenic Council
The Panhellenic Council is the governing body of the sorority system. The Panhellenic Council provides many opportunities for involvement in campus life and the fraternity and sorority system outside of the individual sororities. Recruitment, social, and educational opportunities are provided by the council. All five social sororities recognized by Rochester Institute of Technology are active members of the National Panhellenic Conference.

Multicultural Greek Council
The Multicultural Greek Council serves as the governing body and network of culturally based Greek organizations from the National Pan-Hellenic Council, the National Association of Latino Fraternal Organizations, and the National Asian Pacific Islander Desi American Panhellenic Association.

Special Interest Houses
RIT's dormitories are home to six "Special Interest Houses" — Art House, Computer Science House, Engineering House, House of General Science, Photo House, and Unity House — that provide an environment to live immersed in a specific interest, such as art, engineering, or computing. Members of a special-interest house share their interests with each other and the rest of campus through academic focus and special activities. Special Interest Houses are self-governing and accept members based on their own criteria. In the early 2000s, RIT had a Special Interest House called Business Leaders for Tomorrow, but it no longer exists. Prior to the 2022-2023 academic year, RIT had a Special Interest House called "International House", but it no longer exists.

ROTC programs
RIT is the host of the Air Force ROTC Detachment 538 "Blue Tigers" and the Army ROTC "Tiger Battalion". RIT students may also enroll in the Naval ROTC program based at the University of Rochester.

In 2009, the "Tiger Battalion" was awarded the Eastern Region's Outstanding ROTC Unit Award, given annually by the Order of the Founders and Patriots of America. In 2010, it was awarded the National MacArthur Award for 2nd Brigade.

Reporter Magazine
Reporter magazine (Reporter) is a completely student-run organization. The magazine is a 32-page full-color issue distributed on the first Monday of the month for the duration of the academic year, supplemented with regular online content. 

Reporter began as a newspaper in 1951 and changed to a magazine format in 1969 to better showcase the talents of students enrolled in programs at the College of Imaging Arts & Sciences. The first magazine issue was released on January 10, 1969. The magazine continued to be released on a weekly cycle until 2013.

In 2019, the magazine's long-running Sports section was changed to Wellness to better accommodate recent discussion on the RIT campus regarding mental health. The section now encompasses traditional sports, e-sports, diet and exercise, and mental and emotional health. In 2020, the magazine's Leisure section was changed to Culture, removing much of the perceived overlap between the Wellness and Leisure sections.
 
It is the goal of Reporter to provide insightful content pertinent to the RIT community and the Rochester community at large. This is achieved via six separate sections of the magazine: News, Tech, Culture, Features, Wellness, and Views.

K2GXT – RIT Amateur Radio Club 
Students interested in amateur radio can join K2GXT, the RIT amateur radio club. It is the oldest club on campus, founded in 1952 at the original downtown Rochester campus. The club maintains a UHF and VHF amateur radio repeater system operating on the 2 meter band, and the 70 centimeter band. The repeater system serves the campus and surrounding areas.

WITR 89.7

An FM radio station run by students at RIT, WITR 89.7 broadcasts various music genres, RIT athletic events, and several talk radio programs. WITR can be heard throughout Rochester and its suburbs, and via an online stream on its website. The radio station recently opened up a studio in the SAU with a see-thru window in 2015.

College Activities Board
The College Activities Board, frequently abbreviated as CAB, is a student-run organization responsible for providing "diverse entertainment and activities to enhance student life on the RIT campus." CAB is responsible for annual concerts, class trips, movie screenings, and other frequent events.

Imagine RIT

An annual festival, publicized as "Imagine RIT", was initiated in May 2008 to showcase innovative and creative activity at RIT. It is one of the most prominent changes brought to RIT by former university president, William Destler.

An open event, visitors to Imagine RIT have an opportunity to tour the RIT campus and view new ideas for products and services, admire fine art, explore faculty and student research, examine engineering design projects, and interact with hundreds of hands-on exhibits. Theatrical and musical performances take place at stages in many locations on the RIT campus. Intended to appeal to visitors of all ages, including children, the festival features a variety of exhibits. More than 17,000 people attended the inaugural festival on May 3, 2008, and ten years later the number of people attending has doubled, reaching almost 35,000.

Rochester Game Festival

Sponsored by RIT's MAGIC Center, ROC Game Dev, and the Irondequoit Library, the Rochester Game Festival is an annual convention that showcases video games and tabletop games produced by students and by independent developers in the surrounding region. More than 1,300 people attended the festival in 2019.

RIT Ambulance

RIT Ambulance (RITA) is a community run, 9-1-1 dispatched New York State Certified Basic Life Support Ambulance agency. As a New York State certified ambulance service, RIT Ambulance is an active participant in providing reciprocal mutual-aid with in surrounding communities throughout Monroe county and even New York State. RIT Ambulance is prepared to support any of the neighboring communities’ ambulance services if additional resources are required. RIT Ambulance operates a New York State Certified Basic Life Support ambulance and a Basic Life Support first response / command vehicle.

RIT Ambulance provides coverage 24 hours a day, 7 days a week throughout the year. The ambulance is staffed on a volunteer basis by state-certified students, faculty, staff, alumni and community members. RIT Ambulance also provides standbys as requested for concerts, sporting events, and other social gatherings for the RIT community.

Public Safety
RIT Public Safety is the primary agency responsible for protection of students, staff and property as well as enforcement of both college policies and state laws. Officers are NYS Licensed Security Guards who possess an expanded scope of authority under NYS Education Law, and many Officers have prior law enforcement backgrounds. In 2016, it was announced that RIT Public Safety will deploy officers armed with long guns to respond to active shooter incidents. Public Safety Officers operate both a dispatch center and various types of patrol units on campus and at off campus holdings (such as The Inn and Conference Center) and also manage the Call Box System. Activating a call box will automatically place the user in touch with an Officer in the dispatch center who will direct Patrol Officers to respond to the location; if necessary, Officers will summon the Monroe County Sheriff's to respond as well. As the college does not have 24/7 on campus crisis intervention counselors, in the event of a mental or behavioral health incident during hours where a counselor is not available, Public Safety Officers are also trained to act as mediators until an on-call counselor can be summoned.

Dining services
RIT Dining Services manages a large number of restaurants and food shops, along with the sole dining hall on campus. There are multiple cafeterias and small retail locations throughout the campus, including near the Residence Halls, in the Student Alumni Union, Global Village, and in certain academic buildings. Dining Services at RIT is completely internal and run through the university. RIT Dining Services also provides opportunities for international students to work on campus. In early 2019 the campus started providing food from a Hydroponic farm on campus that supplied lettuce, kale, and other crops.

Governance
RIT is governed under a shared governance model. The shared governance system is composed of the Student Government, the Staff Council, and the Academic Senate. The University Council brings together representatives from all three groups and makes recommendations to the president of the university. Once the University Council has made a recommendation, the president makes the final decision.

Student Government
The Student Government consists of an elected student senate and a cabinet appointed by the president and vice president. Elections for academic and community senators occur each spring, along with the elections for the president and vice president. The cabinet is appointed by the president and vice president.

The Student Government is an advocate for students and is responsible for basic representation as well as improving campus for students. The Student Government endorses proposal that are brought before the University Council.

Academic Senate
The Academic Senate is responsible for representing faculty within the shared governance system. The Academic Senate has 43 senators.

Staff Council
The Staff Council represents staff in the shared governance system.

Notable alumni

RIT has over 125,000 alumni worldwide, with 9 of them having gone on to receive 15 Pulitzer Prizes.
Notable alumni include Bob Duffy, former New York Lieutenant Governor; Tom Curley, former president and CEO of the Associated Press; Daniel Carp, former chairman of the Eastman Kodak Company; Koo Kwang-mo, chairman and CEO of LG Corporation; Clayton Turner, director of NASA’s Langley Research Center; John Resig, software developer and creator of jQuery; N. Katherine Hayles, critical theorist; Austin McChord, founder and CEO of Datto; Jack Van Antwerp, former director of photography for The Wall Street Journal; photojournalist Bernie Boston; and former Executive Director of the EAC and current Deputy Assistant Director of CISA, Mona Harrington.

Presidents and provosts
In the decades prior to the selection of RIT's first president, the university was administered primarily by the board of trustees.

In addition to the ten official presidents, Thomas R. Plough served as acting president twice: once, in February 1991 when M. Richard Rose was on sabbatical with the CIA, and again in 1992 between Rose's retirement and Albert J. Simone's installation.

See also
 Association of Independent Technological Universities
 List of Rochester Institute of Technology alumni

References

Further reading

External links

 

Rochester Institute of Technology
Universities and colleges in Monroe County, New York
Education in Rochester, New York
Engineering universities and colleges in New York (state)
Technological universities in the United States
Private universities and colleges in New York (state)
Educational institutions established in 1829
1829 establishments in New York (state)
Educational buildings in Rochester, New York
Glassmaking schools